Preston were a British speedway team that existed from 1929 to 1932.

History
They first competed in the English Dirt Track League (effectively the Northern League) in 1929 when they were runners-up to Leeds Lions. In the same season they won the English Dirt Track Knockout Cup beating Halifax in the final.

The team raced for two more seasons in the 1930 Speedway Northern League and 1931 Speedway Northern League but closed before the 1932 season.

They were based at Farringdon Park, New Hall Lane, Preston, Lancashire, the track was situated around the perimeter of the Preston Grasshoppers R.F.C. rugby ground. The speedway syndicate agreed a six year sub-tenancy with the rugby club in 1929 but folded in 1932. The location today is Farringdon Crescent.

Notable riders
Joe Abbott
Ham Burrill
Claude Rye

Season summary

References

Defunct British speedway teams
Sport in Preston